Kilien Stengel (born 1972 in Nevers (Nièvre)), is a French gastronomic author, restaurateur, and cookbook writer. He has worked at Gidleigh Park, Nikko Hotels, Georges V Hotel in Paris, and in a number of Relais & Châteaux restaurants (including Marc Meneau and Jacques Lameloise). He was a teacher of gastronomy at the Académie of Paris and of Orléans-Tours. Stengel works at the European Institute for the History and Culture of Food at François Rabelais University. He is captain of a culinary book fair, en directot of a collection book (L'harmattan éditor). Usually, he work for Ministère de l'Éducation nationale teacher competition, Meilleur Ouvrier de France award, and Masterchef France. In 2015 his PhD (Doctorat de 3e cycle) in information science was supervised by J-J. Boutaud.

Works

Actuality books
 Alimentation Bio - Manger et boire bio, Eyrolles publishing, 2009.  
 Gastronomie, petite philosophie du plaisir et du goût, Bréal publishing, 2010. 
 Le petit dictionnaire énervé de la gastronomie, L'opportun publishing, 2011.  
 Gastronomie-Gastrosophie-Gastronomisme, L'Harmattan publishing, 2011. 
 Un Ministère de la gastronomie! Pourquoi pas ?, L'Harmattan publishing, 2011. 
 Manifeste du savoir-manger - Pour que nos enfants sachent se nourrir, Praelego publishing, 2012. 
 Suis-je ce que je mange ?, Le Temps qu'il fait publishing, collection Littérature, 2012. 
 Une cantine peut-elle être pédagogique ? L'Harmattan publishing, 2012. 
 L'Aide alimentaire : colis de vivres et repas philanthropiques - Focus sur la Gigouillette, au profit des Restaurants du Cœur, L'Harmattan publishing, collection travaux historiques, 2012. 
 Traité de la Gastronomie : Patrimoine et Culture, Sang de la Terre publishing, 2012. 
 Ca se bouffe pas, ça se déguste, Bréal publishing, 2013.
 Traité du vin en France : Traditions et Terroir, Sang de la Terre publishing, 2013. 
 Traité du fromage en France : Caséologie et authenticité, Sang de la Terre publishing, 2014.
 Hérédités alimentaires et identité gastronomique, L'Harmattan publishing, 2014. 
 Le lexique culinaire de Ferrandi : tout le vocabulaire de la cuisine et de la pâtisserie expliqué en 1.500 définitions et 200 photographies, Hachette, 2015. 
 Dictionnaire du Bien Manger et des Modèles Culinaires, Honoré Champion, 2015. 
 (dir.) Des fromages et des hommes : Ethnographie pratique, culturelle et sociale du fromage, L'Harmattan, 2015. 
 (co-dir. with Jean-Jacques Boutaud) Cuisine du futur et alimentation de demain, L'Harmattan, 2016. 
 Bien-Manger et Manger Bon : Discours et transmission, L'Harmattan, 2016. 
 (co-dir. with Anne Parizot) Écrits et Discours culinaires : Quand les mots se mettent à table, L'Harmattan, 2016. 
 (dir.) Les gestes culinaires : Mise en scène de savoir-faire, L'Harmattan, 2017. 
 (co-dir. with Thibaut de Saint Pol) Les enjeux sociaux des cuisines du futur et alimentations de demain, Cuisine du futur et alimentation de demain series, L’Harmattan, 2016. 
 Philosophie & Alimentation : la conscience de bien manger, collection Au-delà des apparences, Ovadia, 2018. 
 (co-dir. with Pascal Taranto) Futurophagie : Penser la cuisine de demain, série Cuisine du futur et alimentation de demain, L'Harmattan, 2018. 
 Le lexique culinaire Ferrandi, version coréenne traduite par Hyun Jeong Kang, collection Macaron Éditions Esoope, Séoul, 2017.
 Petit lexique pour comprendre la qualité alimentaire et les labels, Erick Bonnier, 2018, 
 (dir.) La cuisine a-t-elle un sexe ? Femmes - Hommes, mode d'emploi du genre en cuisine, L'Harmattan, 2018 
 (co-dir. with Sihem Debbabi-Missaoui), La cuisine du Maghreb, n’est-elle qu’une simple histoire de couscous ? L’Harmattan, coll. Questions alimentaires et gastronomiques, 2020. 
 (co-dir. with Philomène Bayet-Robert), Le marketing culinaire et alimentaire face aux défis du XXIe siècle, L’Harmattan, série Cuisine du futur et alimentation de demain, 2020. 
(co-dir with Jean-Louis Yengué) Terroir viticole : espace et figure de qualité, collection Tables des hommes, Presses universitaires François-Rabelais, université de Tours, 2020. 
(dir.) Terminologies gastronomiques et œnologiques : Aspects patrimoniaux et culturels, L’Harmattan, coll. Questions alimentaires et gastronomiques, 2020. 

 (dir.) Identités alimentaires et héritages gastronomiques,  Paris, L’Harmattan, coll. Questions alimentaires et gastronomiques, 2020
 (co-dir. with S.Sonneville), Cuisine fantastique et alimentation de fiction, L’Harmattan, série Cuisine du futur et alimentation de demain, 2020
 (dir.) La cuisine de demain vue par 50 chefs, L’Harmattan, série Cuisine du futur et alimentation de demain, 2021
 (co-dir. with Bruno Laurioux), Le modèle culinaire français, Presses universitaires François Rabelais, 2021
 (co-dir. with Jean-Jacques Boutaud), Passions dévorantes : De la gastronomie et de l’excès, Éditions le Manuscrit Savoirs, collection Addictions, 2022.

History books
 La Gastronomie du produit à l'assiette, Éditions Alan Sutton, 2008.
 Chronologie historique de la Gastronomie et de l'Alimentation  (Dictionnaire), Éditions Du Temps (diffusion Éditions du Seuil), 2008.
 Clamecy – Événements fêtes et vie quotidienne, collection Mémoire en images", Éditions Alan Sutton, 2010.
 Anthologie littéraire de la gastronomie à la Belle époque Éditions L&C, 2012
 La gastronomie autrefois, Sud Ouest editor, 2012. 
 Histoire divertissante et curieuse de la gastronomie, Grancher publishing, 2013. 
 A table avec Jules Verne et Phileas Fogg - tour du monde en 80 recettes, editor Agnés Vienot 
 Les classements des vins en France : classifications, distinctions, labellisations, L'Harmattan, 2017.

Poésie books
 Les poètes de la bonne chère, Anthologie de poésie gastronomique, Éditions de la Table ronde, (groupe Gallimard), 2008.
 Drôles de drames, collectif, Codexlibris publishing, 2010.
 Poètes du vin, Poètes divins, préfaces de Jean-Robert Pitte (président of Paris-Sorbonne University), collection Écriture, Archipel publishing, 2012. 
 Permission de servir Éditions L&C, 2012.
 Les poètes de la bonne chère : nouvelle édition, Collection Petite Vermillon Éditions de la Table ronde (groupe Gallimard), 2017.

Trivia books
 Le Petit Quiz du Vin, Dunod (Hachette), 2007.
 Le Grand QCM du vin, Dunod (Hachette), 2007.
 Le Petit Quiz du vin – version japonaise, éditions Sakuhin Sha (Tokyo), 2009
 Le Grand QCM du vin – version japonaise, éditions Sakuhin Sha (Tokyo), 2009
 Le Grand Quiz du Fromage, Éditions Lanore Delagrave, (Groupe Flammarion), 2008.
 Le Grand Quiz de la bière, Éditions Lanore Delagrave, (Groupe Flammarion), 2008. (Gourmand Cookbook Awards 2010, Beer book category)
 QG 500, le quiz de la gastronomie –Testez votre quotient culinaire, Éditions Menu Fretin, 2009.
 Le nouveau petit quiz du vin - 2e édition, Dunod, 2010.
 La Touraine en question, with Patrick Prieur, publisher Alan Sutton, 2011.
 Pommard ou Pomerol ?, Dunod, 2011.
 Montmartre en question - Patrimoine et gastronomie, co-author, publisher Alan Sutton, 2011
 Almaniak Tout sur le vin en 365 jours 2015, Éditions 365, 2014.

Games
 La boîte à Quiz spéciale Cuisine - Testez votre quotient culinaire, Éditions Marabout, 2011.

Practical books
 Les critiques aux fourneaux, au profit des Restos du Coeur, collectif, Éditions 4 chemins 2008  (Gourmand World Cookbook Awards 2009, Livre caritatif category)
 Œnologie et crus des vins, Éditions Jérôme Villette (diffusion Matfer), 2008.
 Le kit pédagogique du professeur professionnel, éditions Eyrolles 2008.
 Choisir son vin ! Super facile !, Éditions Solar, 2017,

School books
 Aide-mémoire de la gastronomie en France, Éditions BPI, 2006.
 Technologie de service, Éditions Bertrand Lacoste 2008.
 Technologie culinaire, Éditions Bertrand Lacoste 2008.
 (dir.) Enseigner l'alimentation, un projet de société : Les Enseignements pratiques interdisciplinaires, L’Harmattan, 2017.

CD 
 Œnologie & crus des vins, (durée 12h20) Éditions Groupement des Intellectuels Aveugles ou Amblyopes (GIAA) - DAISY, 2010.

Part of book and direction of book 
 "L'enseignement des vins en école hôtelière", in review Les Territoires du vin, Varia, of Chaire UNESCO « Culture et Traditions du Vin », Maison des sciences de l'homme of Dijon, 2012 
 "Préface", in Guide P'tit Jacques, Adfields, 2012
 "Postface", in book Plaidoyer pour l'enseignement des pratiques alimentaires (Hélène Baumert), L'Harmattan, 2013
 "Étude de documents, La relation Mets-Vins", in review TDC n°1064 « Les Repas gastronomique des Français », CNDP, 2013
 "L'enseignement des produits laitiers en école hôtelière : une approche plurielle", in Les reconfigurations récentes des filières laitières en France et en Europe (dir. Daniel Ricard), coll. CERAMAC, Presses universitaires Blaise Pascal, 2013
 "L'explosion des pratiques & loisirs culinaires au XXIe siècle", in review ESPACES, éditions touristiques européennes, 2014
 "L'histoire du canard", in book Le Canard, First edition, 2014  
 Book review "Parler vin Entre normes et appropriations" de R. Reckinger, in Food & History, Brepols, Turnhout-Belgique, 2015
 "La dégustation du vin : un acte expérientiel et identitaire entre théâtralisation et culturalisation", in review Lexia n. 19 Alimentation et identité culturelle, Aracne Editrice, Rome, 2015
 "Quand le bon ne rend pas insensible : du bon et de ses rapports avec le sensoriel, conceptuel, relationnel, expérientiel", in  Sensible et communication : du cognitif au symbolique (dir.Jean-Jacques Boutaud), ISTE éditions, London, 2015
 "Modèles du bons et concepts du bien manger" in Revue des Sciences Sociales, n°54 « Voir/Savoir », coordonné par Pascal Hintermeyer, Presses universitaires de Strasbourg, 2015
 "L'interdiscours dans la dégustation : une (re)signification des représentations du vocabulaire du vin" in Patrimoine, création, culture à l'intersection des dispositifs et des publics (dir. Cristina Bogdan, Béatrice Fleury, Jacques Walter), coll. "Communication et civilisation" L'Harmattan, 2015
 "Tout ce qui est nouveau est-il tendance ?" in Les Cahiers des Rencontres François Rabelais : Nouvelles tendances culinaires : 10 ans après !, IEHCA, 2015
 "Le Gastronomisme, un sixième sens utile aux repas du futur", in Cuisine du futur et Alimentation de demain, L'Harmattan, 2016
 "La place du culinaire dans le monde de l'écrit : entre excellence et humanisme" in Écrits et discours culinaires : Quand les mots se mettent à table, L'Harmattan, 2016
 "Le paradigme du bien manger : du pragmatique à l'identitaire" in Revue Sciences, Langage et Communication Vol. 1, n°1, École Supérieure de Technologie de  Meknès (ESTM), Morocco, 2016
 (with A-H.Marinescu), "Wine Tasting Discourse: Traditional Knowledge, and Practice" in Journal of Social Sciences, Science Publications, Open Journal of Social Sciences, Vol.4 (n°5), pp. 124–134, Wuhan City, Hubei, China, 2016.
 "Paroles de chef : modèles communicationnels d'une organisation professionnelle", Revue de la Société française des sciences de l'information et de la communication, n°9, 2016.
 "La représentation du bon produit et sa transmission", in C. Hugol-Gential, J.-J. Boutaud (dir.) La gastronomie au cœur de la Cité, Éditions universitaires de Dijon (EUD).
 "La bonne cuisine avec ses bons mots", in (dir. F. Argod-Dutard) Le français se met à table, Presses Universitaires de Rennes, 2017. .
 "Pierre-François de La Varenne", in (dir. Danièle Sallenave) Recueil des Commémorations nationales 2018, Ministère de la Culture, 2017. .
 "Bien manger essence d’une pérennité ?", in (dir. C.Hugol-Gential) Bien et bon à manger, Editions Universitaires de Dijon, 2018. .
 "Le vocabulaire de dégustation du vin : Un outil de médiation à la signification patrimoniale", in (dir. V. Négri et N. Lancret) L’odyssée des mots du patrimoine, Presses de l'Université du Québec, 2018
 "La bonne cuisine diachronique : discours et modèles", in (dir. D. Nourrisson) Boire et manger, une histoire culturelle, La Diana, 2018. .
 "La représentation de bonne cuisine française du XXIe siècle", in Contemporary French Civilization 42.3-4, Special Issue Beyond Gastronomy: French Food for the 21st century, (dir. Michael Garval & Philippe C. Dubois), Liverpool University Press, ISSN 0147-9156
 "Les significations de la dégustation", in (dir. N. Franjus-Adenis) Communiquer autrement, le vin dans l'imaginaire, L'Harmattan, 2018. .
 "Panorama didactique et culturel du vocabulaire alimentaire et des écrits culinaires", in (dir. I. Pierozak) Penser les diversités linguistiques et culturelles. Francophonies, formations à distance, migrances, Lambert-Lucas .

Collaborations reviews
 Director collection Gastronomie et art culinaire, Éditions du Temps (2006–2010)
 Responsible publishing de Gusto, revue culturelle, Éditions ASA (2008–2009)
 Member of the editorial committee, Presses universitaires François Rabelais
 Collaborator Food & History, revue scientifique européenne, Éditions Brepols
 Member of the editorial committee, Les Cahiers de la gastronomie, revue culturelle, éditions Menu Fretin, (Prix littéraire Gastronomie-culture 2010)

Awards 
 2015 : The French government awarded him its highest honour, the decorations of Officier in Order of Agricultural Merit.
2021 : Gourmand World Cookbook Awards, catégorie "Food Heritage & UNESCO" pour Identités alimentaires et héritages gastronomiques  
2021 : Gourmand World Cookbook Awards, catégorie "Future food 21st century" pour La cuisine de demain vue par 50 étoiles d’aujourd’hui
2020 : Gourmand World Cookbook Awards, catégorie "Afrique du nord" pour La Cuisine du Maghreb n’est elle qu’une simple histoire de couscous ? 
2020 : Gourmand World Cookbook Awards, catégorie "Pour professionnel" pour Le marketing culinaire et alimentaire face aux défis du XXIe siècle.
 2018 : Concours international littéraire Prix Arts et Lettres de France, Essay category.
 2018 : Prix Arts et Lettres de France, catégorie Essai.
 2018 : "Food's Who - Les 500 acteurs les plus influents de la Food en France", website Atabula
 2018 : Gourmand World Cookbook Awards, category Host country pour l'ouvrage collectif Gastronomie au cœur de la Cité (dirigé par J-J. Boutaud, C. Hugol-Gential, S. Dufour)(Editions universitaires de Dijon)
 2018 : Gourmand World Cookbook Awards, category Livres pour professionnels pour Les gestes culinaires : Mise en scène de savoir-faire(ed. L'Harmattan) 
 2017 : Gourmand World Cookbook Awards, category Health and Nutrition for Bien-Manger et Manger Bon : Discours et transmission (ed. L'Harmattan).
 2015 : Gourmand World Cookbook Awards, categoryBest French Cuisine Book for Lexique culinaire Ferrandi (ed. Hachette) 
 2015 : Gourmand World Cookbook Awards, category Best Cheese – Milk  Book for Des fromages et des hommes (ed. L'Harmattan) 
 2015 : The French government awarded him its highest honour, the decorations of Chevalier in Order of Agricultural Merit.
 2014 : Prix Montesquieu, category Littérature for Poètes du vin Poètes divins.
 2014 : Nomination au prix Jean Carmet, salon du livre et du vin de Saumur, for Traité du vin (Sang de la terre)
 2013 : Gourmand World Cookbook Awards, category Littérature gastronomique for Histoire divertissante et curieuse de la Gastronomie (ed. Grancher). 
 2013 : Grand prix Académie nationale de cuisine, category Cuisine du monde for A table avec Jules Verne - Le tour du monde de Phileas Fogg en 80 recettes (ed. Vienot)
 2012 : Gourmand World Cookbook Awards, category Cuisine Française for Le Traité de la gastronomie française (ed. Sang de la terre)
 2012 : Mérite culinaire Prosper Montagné
 2010 : Gourmand World Cookbook Awards for Le Grand Quiz de la bière (éd. Delagrave)
 2009 : Gourmand World Cookbook Awards for Les critiques aux fourneaux (ed.Quatre Chemins)
 2009 : Gourmand World Cookbook Awards for Chronologie de la gastronomie et de l'alimentation (ed. du temps)
 2008 : Mention spéciale du jury du 'Salon international du livre gourmand', à Périgueux, for Les critiques aux Fourneaux (éd. Quatre Chemins).

References

Links
 Site officiel de Kilien Stengel
 Fiche universitaire Dijon

1972 births
Living people
People from Nevers
French food writers
Wine critics
French chefs
French restaurateurs
French male non-fiction writers
Oenologists